Marcel Niederer (born 9 September 1960 in St. Gallen) is a Swiss entrepreneur and former ice hockey player. He mainly became famous by his sports career and the investment in Belinda Bencic.

Life

Career 
He is a host couple’s son who was born in St. Gallen and spent his childhood in Uzwil. Soon he started helping out his parents in their hotel/restaurant. At the age of eight, Marcel Niederer joined the junior-teams of the Ice-Hockey-Team in Uzwil. At the age of 17, he made his debut in the first team of the EHC Uzwil, which then was playing in the National League B. Two years later he made the final leap into the Top Swiss Hockey League (National League A) team of Lausanne HC. Altogether, Marcel Niederer has been playing seven years in the National League A (Lausanne HC, ZSC Lions and EHC Biel). He became Swiss Champion twice (1981 and 1983 with EHC Biel). Marcel Niederer let his career fade away in the National League B and 1st League with EHC Uzwil. 

In parallel with his sports career, Marcel Niederer received a commercial apprenticeship as a trustee and afterwards, he finished his studies in marketing and public administration at the university of applied sciences in Olten.

Entrepreneur 
After his studies and his sports career, Marcel Niederer founded a trust company, which offered fiduciary services. Additionally, he was buying old buildings in order to renovate them. Since 1991, Marcel Niederer displaced his activities to Eastern Germany and Russia. A number of years following, Marcel Niederer was selling bananas and mandarins in Eastern Germany and subsequently instant coffee (Nescafé) and fashion (leather goods and clothing from MCM Modern Creation Munich) in Russia. Down to the present day, Marcel Niederer is doing business in Russia. Since 2003 Marcel Niederer invested in Belinda Bencic’s tennis career. He is also her manager. Since 2006, Marcel Niederer operates in building new apartment blocks in Eastern Switzerland. 

Niederer is married with three daughters. His youngest child, Christina Niederer, is a former figure skater and dancer. He lives with his family in Switzerland although Marcel Niederer has maintained his business in Russia, mainly in Moscow.

References

External links
 
 Daniel Germann: NZZ Belinda Bencic. Die ungewöhnliche Geschichte einer Karriere. Neue Zürcher Zeitung vom 2. September 2015
 René Stauffer: Tagesanzeiger «Ich spürte, wie ernst es Belinda und Ivan ist». Tages-Anzeiger vom 7. Oktober 2015
 Christopher Clarey: New York Times Belinda Bencic Is a Phenom Who Loves to Lob. NY Times vom 22. Januar 2016 (englisch)

1960 births
Living people
Swiss business executives
Swiss ice hockey players
Sportspeople from St. Gallen (city)